Ahmed Krawa'a (born April 21, 1989) is a Libyan footballer. He currently plays for the Libyan Premier League club Al-Ahly Tripoli, as a striker.

2008–09 season
A promising young striker, Krawa'a was signed by Ittihad Tripoli in January 2008. Though he received few opportunities in the first team, he managed to get two goals, including an 87th-minute equaliser in a 1-1 draw with his former club, Shat.

2009–10 season
Tersanah loaned Krawa'a during the summer transfer window. He has so far impressed at the capital club; his first two goals were against his employers in the 3-2 2009 Libyan Super Cup defeat. He haunted Shat again in the league when he struck against them in the derby match, with a dramatic 93rd-minute equaliser. He has since scored in each round of matches (as of Round 6), apart from the 2-0 defeat to Khaleej Sirte. He so far has 6 goals in 6 league games, and was the top scorer at the mid-season break, with 10 goals.

As Tersanah embarked on their first foray into continental competition in 2009-10, Krawa'a scored The Arsenal'''s first goal in CAF competition, calmly converting a 95th-minute penalty against CR Belouizdad of Algeria to earn his side a first-leg 1–1 draw.

International
Krawa'a made his debut for the Libyan national team on October 5, 2009, in a friendly match against Kuwait. He managed to grab an 88th-minute equaliser, hence scoring on his international debut.

International goalsScores and results list Libya's goal tally first.''

References

Living people
Libyan footballers
1989 births
Libya international footballers
Al-Ahli SC (Tripoli) players
Association football forwards
Libyan Premier League players